Diogo Sousa Verdasca (born 26 October 1996) is a Portuguese professional footballer who plays as a central defender for Polish club Śląsk Wrocław.

Club career

Porto
Born in Guimarães, Minho Province, Verdasca played youth football for four clubs, including FC Porto in two different spells. On 9 August 2015 he made his senior debut, playing 81 minutes for the reserves in a 1–2 home loss to Portimonense S.C. in the Segunda Liga. He scored twice during his first season, against C.D. Feirense (2–0 home win) and S.L. Benfica B (3–1, also at home), as they won the championship but were ineligible for promotion.

In February 2016, the 19-year-old Verdasca was called to the first team for the first time, for a UEFA Europa League match at Borussia Dortmund, but remained an unused substitute in the 2–0 away loss.

Zaragoza
On 17 July 2017, Verdasca signed a three-year contract with Spanish Segunda División side Real Zaragoza. He was sent off on 9 December in the first half-hour of a 3–0 home defeat against Cádiz CF, for insulting the referee after receiving a yellow card. 

Verdasca scored his first goal for them on 8 September 2018, in a 4–0 away rout of Real Oviedo.

Beitar Jerusalem
Verdasca switched countries again on 21 August 2019, joining Beitar Jerusalem F.C. of the Israeli Premier League on a two-year deal with the option of a third. Just over a month after signing, his team won the Toto Cup with a 2–1 victory over Maccabi Haifa FC.

Verdasca was released in March 2021 for reasons within his contract that could not be made public. In an interview with Portuguese media, he said that the club from the Holy Land had unravelled following the removal of Yossi Benayoun as sporting director.

Honours
Porto B
LigaPro: 2015–16

Beitar Jerusalem
Israeli Toto Cup: 2019–20

References

External links

Portuguese League profile 

National team data 

1996 births
Living people
Sportspeople from Guimarães
Portuguese footballers
Association football defenders
Liga Portugal 2 players
FC Porto B players
Segunda División players
Real Zaragoza players
Israeli Premier League players
Beitar Jerusalem F.C. players
Ekstraklasa players
Śląsk Wrocław players
Portugal youth international footballers
Portuguese expatriate footballers
Expatriate footballers in Spain
Expatriate footballers in Israel
Expatriate footballers in Poland
Portuguese expatriate sportspeople in Spain
Portuguese expatriate sportspeople in Israel
Portuguese expatriate sportspeople in Poland